Royal Hedley Long (4 September 1914 – 4 April 1985) was an Australian rules footballer who played with Hawthorn in the Victorian Football League (VFL).

Notes

External links 

1914 births
1985 deaths
Australian rules footballers from Launceston, Tasmania
Hawthorn Football Club players
Launceston Football Club players